NWO may refer to:
 Dutch Research Council, the national research council of the Netherlands	
 New World Order (disambiguation)
 New World Order (conspiracy theory), a conspiracy theory referring to the emergence of a totalitarian one world government
 New world order (politics), any period of history evidencing a dramatic change in world political thought and the balance of power
 New world order (Baháʼí), teachings in the Baháʼí Faith pertaining to a world federal system of government. 
 New World Order (professional wrestling), professional wrestling stable (most often stylized as nWo)
 New Worlds Observer, orbital telescope system
 New World Orphans, album by Hed PE
 "N.W.O." (song), 1992 song by Ministry
 WWE No Way Out, professional wrestling event

See also
New Order (disambiguation)
NWD (disambiguation)